Tyrol is a state (Land) in western Austria. It comprises the Austrian part of the historical Princely County of Tyrol. It is a constituent part of the present-day Euroregion Tyrol–South Tyrol–Trentino (together with South Tyrol and Trentino in Italy). The capital of Tyrol is Innsbruck.

Geography
The state of Tyrol is separated into two parts, divided by a  strip of the state of Salzburg. The two constituent parts of Tyrol are the northern and larger North Tyrol (Nordtirol) and the southeastern and smaller East Tyrol (Osttirol). Salzburg lies to the east of North Tyrol, while on the south it has a border with the Italian province of South Tyrol (Trentino-Alto Adige/Südtirol) which was part of the Austro-Hungarian Empire before the First World War.

North Tyrol shares its borders with the federal state of Salzburg in the east and Vorarlberg in the west. In the north, it adjoins the German state of Bavaria; in the south, it shares borders with the Italian province of South Tyrol and the Swiss canton of Graubünden. East Tyrol shares its borders with the federal state of Carinthia to the east and Italy's Province of Belluno (Veneto) to the south.

The state's territory is located entirely within the Eastern Alps at the Brenner Pass. The highest mountain in the state is the Großglockner, part of the Hohe Tauern range on the border with Carinthia.  It has a height of 3,797 m (12,457.35 ft), making it the highest mountain in Austria.

Lakes
Buchsee (Bezirk Kufstein)
Fernsteinsee
Frauensee (Bezirk Kufstein)
Gritzer See
Moalandlsee
Pfrillsee
Taubensee (Kössen/Unterwössen)

History

In ancient times, the region was split between the Roman provinces of Raetia (west of the Inn River) and Noricum. From the mid-6th century, it was resettled by Germanic Bavarii tribes. In the Early Middle Ages it formed the southern part of the German stem duchy of Bavaria, until the Counts of Tyrol, former Vogt officials of the Trent and Brixen prince-bishops at Tyrol Castle, achieved imperial immediacy after the deposition of the Bavarian duke Henry the Proud in 1138, and their possessions formed a state of the Holy Roman Empire in its own right.

When the Counts of Tyrol died out in 1253, their estates were inherited by the Meinhardiner Counts of Görz. In 1271, the Tyrolean possessions were divided between Count Meinhard II of Görz and his younger brother Albert I, who took the lands of East Tyrol around Lienz and attached it (as "outer county") to his committal possessions around Gorizia ("inner county").

The last Tyrolean countess of the Meinhardiner Dynasty, Margaret, bequeathed her assets to the Habsburg duke Rudolph IV of Austria in 1363. In 1420, the committal residence was relocated from Merano to Innsbruck. The Tyrolean lands were reunited when the Habsburgs inherited the estates of the extinct Counts of Görz in 1500.

In the course of the German mediatization in 1803, the prince-bishoprics of Trent and Brixen were secularized and merged into the County of Tyrol (which in the next year became a constituent land of the Austrian Empire), but Tyrol was ceded to the Kingdom of Bavaria in 1805. Andreas Hofer led the Tyrolean Rebellion against the French and Bavarian occupiers. Later, South Tyrol was ceded to the Kingdom of Italy, a client state of the First French Empire, by Bavaria in 1810. After Napoleon's defeat, the whole of Tyrol was returned to Austria in 1814.

Tyrol was a Cisleithanian Kronland (royal territory) of Austria-Hungary from 1867. The County of Tyrol then extended beyond the boundaries of today's state, including  North Tyrol and East Tyrol; South Tyrol and Trentino (Welschtirol) as well as three municipalities, which today are part of the adjacent Province of Belluno. After World War I, these lands became part of the Kingdom of Italy according to the 1915 London Pact and the provisions of the Treaty of Saint Germain. From November 1918, it was occupied by 20,000–22,000 soldiers of the Italian Army.

Tyrol was the center of an important resistance group against Nazi Germany around Walter Caldonazzi, which united with the group around the priest Heinrich Maier and the Tyrolean Franz Josef Messner. The Catholic resistance group very successfully passed on plans and production facilities for V-1 rockets, V-2 rockets, Tiger tanks, Messerschmitt Me 163 Komet and other aircraft to the Allies, with which they could target German production facilities. Maier and his group informed the American secret service OSS very early on about the mass murder of Jews in Auschwitz. For after the war they planned an Austria united with South Tyrol and Bavaria.

After World War II, North Tyrol was governed by France and East Tyrol was part of the British Zone of occupation until Austria regained independence in 1955.

Towns

The capital, Innsbruck, is known for its university, and especially for its medicine. Tyrol is popular for its famous ski resorts, which include Kitzbühel, Ischgl and St. Anton. The 15 largest towns in Tyrol are:

Demographics
The historical population is given in the following chart:

Economy 
The gross domestic product (GDP) of the state was 34.6 billion euro in 2018, accounting for 9% of the Austria's economic output. GDP per capita adjusted for purchasing power was 40,900 euro or 136% of the EU27 average in the same year.

Transport 
Tyrol has long been a central hub for European long-distance routes and thus a transit land for trans-European trade over the Alps. As early as the 1st century B.C. Tyrol had one of the most important north–south links of the Roman Empire, the Via Claudia Augusta. Roman roads crossed the Tyrol from the Po Plain in present-day Italy, following the course of the Etsch and Eisack in present South Tyrol over the Brenner and then following the northern Wipp valley to Hall. From there roads branched along the River Inn. The Via Raetia went westwards and up onto the Seefeld Plateau, where it crossed into Bavaria where Scharnitz is today. The Porta Claudia, built in the early 17th century is a fortification that underlines the importance of the road in the Early Modern Period.

Today Tyrol has international road, rail and air connections. Innsbruck Airport is Tyrol's international airport. In addition there are several smaller airports in various places such as St. Johann in Tirol, Höfen in the Außerfern or Langkampfen. Many public transit companies operate a common tariff scheme as part of the Tyrol Transport Association.

Administrative divisions

The state is divided into nine districts (Bezirke); one of them, Innsbruck, is a statutory city. There are 277 municipalities. The districts and their administrative centres, from west to east and north to south, are:

 North Tyrol
 Landeck District, (capital: Landeck)
 Reutte District, (Reutte)
 Imst District, (Imst)
 Innsbruck-Land, (Innsbruck, not part of the district)
 Innsbruck Stadt
 Schwaz District, (Schwaz)
 Kufstein District, (Kufstein)
 Kitzbühel District, (Kitzbühel)

 East Tyrol
 Lienz District, (Lienz)

Sister relationships 
  Special Region of Yogyakarta, Indonesia

Culture 
The traditional form of mural art known as Lüftlmalerei is typical of Tyrolean villages and towns.

Kletzenbrot is a sweet bread made with dried fruits and nuts for the Advent season. Because it is associated with Tyrol it is also known as "Tyrolean Dried Fruit Bread".

Identity 

The question of which regional unit was the bearer of primary identification was raised in the 1987 Austrian Consciousness Survey.
The possible answers were: the hometown (local patriotism), one's own province (regional patriotism), (Central) Europe (European consciousness), the world (cosmopolitanism).

A research project led by Peter Diem offers a thoroughly comparable picture: In Vienna and Lower Austria, Austria patriotism dominated (1988) over territorial consciousness. In Upper Austria, Salzburg and Styria, national patriotism slightly outweighed state patriotism. In Carinthia, Tyrol and Vorarlberg, national patriotism clearly dominated. When asked to rate their own national patriotism on a ten-point scale, 83% of Carinthians, 69% of Tyroleans, 63% of Vorarlbergers, Burgenlanders and Styrians, 59% of Upper Austrians, 55% of Lower Austrians, 47% of Viennese and 43% of Salzburgers gave it the highest value.

The results of this study underline the assumption of a highly developed sense of national identity in most Austrian provinces. Peculiarly, the federal provinces are also largely "endogamous" in relation to other provinces, i.e. they correspond to what ethnologists would call a gentile association, a "tribe".

It is therefore also permissible to identify the inhabitants of the Austrian provinces as the "tribes" that a book published in London would like to portray. (The Times Guide to the Peoples of Europe, London 1994The Times guide to the peoples of Europe)

See also

 Tyrol
 East Tyrol
 Euroregion Tyrol-South Tyrol-Trentino
 Grünausee
 History of Tyrol
 Längentalspeicher
 North Tyrol
 Reither See

References

 
NUTS 2 statistical regions of the European Union
States of Austria